Elspeth B. Cypher (born February 26, 1959) is an associate justice of the Supreme Judicial Court of Massachusetts and the former justice of the Massachusetts Appeals Court.

Early life, education and legal career
Cypher was born in Pittsburgh, Pennsylvania, on February 26, 1959. She earned her Bachelor of Arts from Emerson College in 1980 and her Juris Doctor from Suffolk University Law School in 1986. She began her legal career as an associate with the law firm Grayer, Brown and Dilday. She left the firm in 1988 to become an assistant district attorney in Bristol County. In 1993, she became the chief of the appellate division of this office and served in this capacity until her appointment to the appeals court.

Cypher and her wife, Sharon Levesque, live in Assonet, Massachusetts, and have one son.

Judicial career

Massachusetts Appeals Court
Cypher was an associate justice on the Massachusetts Appeals Court. She was appointed to by Governor Paul Cellucci and took the bench on December 27, 2000. She served in that capacity until her elevation to the Massachusetts Supreme Judicial Court on March 31, 2017.

Massachusetts Supreme Judicial Court
She was appointed to the Supreme Judicial Court in February 2017 by Governor Charlie Baker to succeed retiring Justice Margot Botsford. She was confirmed by the Governor's Council on March 8, 2017. She was sworn into office on March 31, 2017. She was ceremonially sworn in on May 18, 2017.

Academic career
Cypher was an adjunct professor at Southern New England School of Law (now the University of Massachusetts School of Law - Dartmouth), where she taught courses on legal writing; criminal procedure; criminal law; and women, law, and the legal system.

See also 
 List of LGBT state supreme court justices in the United States
 List of LGBT jurists in the United States

References

External links
Official Biography on Supreme Court website

Living people
1959 births
20th-century American judges
21st-century American judges
20th-century American women judges
21st-century American women judges
American women academics
American women lawyers
Emerson College alumni
Judges of the Massachusetts Appeals Court
Justices of the Massachusetts Supreme Judicial Court
LGBT judges
Massachusetts lawyers
People from Pittsburgh
Suffolk University Law School alumni
University of Massachusetts faculty